Prince Augustyn Józef Czartoryski (10 October 1907 - 1 July 1946) was a Polish noble (szlachcic). He was the son of Prince Adam Ludwik Czartoryski (and grandson of Princess Marguerite Adélaïde of Orléans) and Countess Maria Ludwika Krasińska.

After the death of his father, Prince Augustyn took over the running of the Family Museum and became  ordynat of the Sieniawa Ordynacja properties. On 12 August 1937, he married Princess Maria de los Dolores of Borbon y Orleans, daughter of Prince Carlos of Bourbon, Infante of Spain and Princess Louise of Orléans.

Due to the prospect of war, the most precious objects were transported to Sieniawa Palace and walled up. The rest of the items were carried down to the Museum cellars, but in September as the bombs fell on Kraków Prince Augustyn and Princess Dolores, who was pregnant, decided to leave Sieniawa for a better refuge. On 18 September German troops found the cases and looted them.

After the Germans moved on, Prince Augustyn removed all the treasures to his cousin's estate in Pełkinie saving them from the Workers' and Peasants' Red Army, but the Gestapo traced all objects and removed all important cases from their hiding places. Soon after, Prince Augustyn and Princess Dolores were picked up by the Gestapo and put under arrest. After heavy negotiation, and thanks to their royal Italian and Spanish connections, they were deported and managed to reach Spain before the end of 1939. During his exile in Spain Prince Augustyn was very active in the Polish resistance, but his poor health and his desperation had its toll on his life. He died at the age of 39, leaving his young son Adam Karol to be brought up in Spain.

In 1946, Prince Augustyn died and was buried in the crypt of the Silesian Church in Seville, Spain, along his son Ludwik Piotr who died at the age of one.

See also
 Infanta Luisa Fernanda, Duchess of Montpensier

1907 births
1946 deaths
Augustyn Jozef Czartoryski
Directors of museums in Poland
People from the Russian Empire of Polish descent
Polish emigrants to Spain
Nobility from Warsaw
Polish Roman Catholics